Leptolaena multiflora is a species of flowering plant in the family Sarcolaenaceae. It is found only in Madagascar. Its natural habitats are subtropical or tropical moist lowland forests and sandy shores. It is threatened by habitat loss.

References

multiflora
Endemic flora of Madagascar
Endangered plants
Taxonomy articles created by Polbot
Flora of the Madagascar lowland forests